Nihal Sudeesh (born 18 June 2001) is an Indian professional footballer who plays as a winger for Indian Super League club Kerala Blasters.

Club career

Early life and career 
Nihal was born in Kochi, Kerala on 18 June 2001. Nihal joined the reserve squad of the Kerala Blasters FC in 2019 and represented the side in the 2019–20 I-League 2nd Division season before leaving the club for the Durand Cup side Indian Navy in 2021. After quitting his job at Indian Navy, Nihal signed again for the Blasters' B team, where his performance in the 2022 Reliance Foundation Development League and in the 2022 Next Gen Cup earned him a promotion to the senior squad of the Kerala Blasters.

Kerala Blasters FC 
In 2022, Nihal was included in the Kerala Blasters squad for the 2022–23 Indian Super League season. He was one among the seven native players for the club for the season. Nihal made his debut for the Blasters senior team in the Indian Super League on 23 October 2022 against Odisha FC by coming in as a substitute for Hormipam Ruivah in the 64th minute, but the Blasters lost the match 2–1 at full-time.  He remained as an unused substitute for two months, and made his second appearance on 26 December in the returning fixture against Odisha as a substitute for Rahul KP in the 70th minute, which the Blasters won 1–0. Nihal was acclaimed by the media and fans for his short-performance against Odisha.

Career statistics 
As of 17 January 2023

References

Living people
2001 births
Indian footballers
Kerala Blasters FC players
Footballers from Kerala
Indian Super League players
Kerala Blasters FC Reserves and Academy players